Bethany Township is a non-functioning administrative division of Iredell County, North Carolina, United States. By the requirements of the North Carolina Constitution of 1868, the counties were divided into townships, which included Bethany township as one of sixteen townships in Iredell County.

Geography
Bethany township is bounded by Olin township on the north, Concord township on the west, Statesville township on the south, and Cool Springs township on the east.

History
The following churches, schools, towns, and historical sites are or have been located in what became Bethany township in 1868: 
Bethany Presbyterian Church (organized in 1775)
Ebenezer Academy (founded in 1822)
Duffy School
Fairview School House
Houpe Store
J. A. Morrison Store
J. S. Gibson School
Rose Chapel
South River Church

References

Townships in Iredell County, North Carolina
Townships in North Carolina
1868 establishments in North Carolina